Whammy! Push Your Luck is a Philippine television game show broadcast by GMA Network. The show is based on American game shows Second Chance and Whammy! The All-New Press Your Luck. Hosted by Paolo Bediones and Rufa Mae Quinto, it premiered on October 8, 2007. The show concluded on February 29, 2008, with a total of 105 episodes.

Gameplay

Round 1
Each contestant starts with PHP 1,000 to start the round.

The first round has cash amounts ranging from PHP 1,000 to PHP 5,000, and prizes typically worth several thousand pesos.

Special spaces
 Directional Squares: "Go Back Two Spaces" and "Advance Two Spaces" (the contestant would earn whatever was at that space on the board, as if they had landed on that space in the first place), plus "Pick A Space" (the contestant could choose to move to either of the adjacent board spaces and take whatever was displayed there).
 Whammy Bank: Known in the 2003 season episodes of the original US version as the "Big Bank," any Whammies hit placed all cash and prizes into the said space. A contestant had to hit the Big Bank space and answer a question correctly to take all cash and prizes in the bank.

Round 2
There are four questions in the question round, which is faithful to the 2002-03 US game.  A player can earn a maximum of twelve spins in a question round (by being the first to buzz in on all four questions, and answering all four correctly), and the maximum for all three would be 20.

Round 3
The second and final round board has much higher values ranging from P1,250 to P125,000, and is also added with special prizes by the sponsors of the show. Their value is PHP60,000 - P50,000 cash and P10,000 worth of the sponsor's product (now P100,000 to P150,000).

If two or all three players were tied, the player with the fewest spins went first; if they were tied for that as well, the player to the hosts' left went first.

The Double Whammy space is marked with two Whammies.  A player who hit the Double Whammy space would also have mischief on the player, although this version had more slime and pies rather than various objects related to United States version.  A player who hits the Double Whammy space is only charged one Whammy.

As is the case with the franchise, four Whammies eliminates a player from the game.

The contestant that has the highest money earned will be the winner. Only this contestant will get the money (s)he earned.

References

External links
 

2007 Philippine television series debuts
2008 Philippine television series endings
Filipino-language television shows
GMA Network original programming
Philippine game shows
Television series by Fremantle (company)